Table Island is a conspicuous flat-topped, rocky island lying north of Greenwich Island and north-northwest of the Aitcho group on the west side of English Strait in the South Shetland Islands, Antarctica.

The area was visited by early-19th-century sealers.

The island was descriptively named by sealers from its shape, while the rock was descriptively named from the breakers it creates, following a survey from HMS Protector in 1967.

Location

See also

 Aitcho Islands
 Composite Antarctic Gazetteer
 List of Antarctic islands south of 60° S
 SCAR
 South Shetland Islands
 Territorial claims in Antarctica

References

External links 
 SCAR Composite Antarctic Gazetteer.

Islands of the South Shetland Islands